Mankessim is a town in the Central Region of Ghana, West Africa. It is  approximately 75 km west of Accra, on the main road to Sekondi-Takoradi.  It is the traditional headquarters of the Fante ethnic group of Ghana. Mankessim's history is linked to three famed warriors: Obrumankoma, Odapagyan and Oson, who helped the Fante people migrate from Techiman in the current Bono Region to Adoagyir in the Central Region.  The town is located at an elevation of 75 meters above sea level and its population according to the 2010 Census was 38,313.

Mankessim is the traditional paramountcy for all Fante-speaking people and was the location of the sacred Nananom Pow (sacred grove) which is also near Obidan. It has a large market that attracts traders from Ghana and beyond. Just as in other prominent Fante towns, Mankessim has Asafo companies, traditional military groups which no longer fight wars but are acknowledged for their role in the history and development of the town.

History
Mankessim was the capital of the old Mankessim Kingdom that existed from 1252 to 1844.

Notable people
Lydia Forson; actress - born in 1984  
Augustine Arhinful; footballer - born in 1994.
Nanahemaa Ama Amissah III; Paramount Queen mother of Mankessim

Health
Mankessim has a number of hospitals and clinics, and therefore, access to healthcare in the town is quite high. Some of these health centers are the Mercy Women's hospital located near the Manna Heights Hotel and Conference Center, Fynba Hospital, and a branch of the Sanford World Clinic in Ghana (inaugurated in 2013
).

Recreation 
There are a lot of attractive places to visit in this town including ecological and cultural sites. There are also reputable hotels and guest houses available where visitors can lodge and rest. Examples include Manna Heights Hotel and Conference Center and Fowaa Lodge.

Banks 

 Ghana Commercial Bank
 Kakum Rural Bank
 Multi Credit
 Agricultural Development Bank

See also 

 Mankessim murder

External links
Ghana-pedia webpage - Mankessim

References

Populated places in the Central Region (Ghana)